June Leaf (born 1929) is an American artist known for her abstract allegorical paintings and drawings; she also works in modernist kinetic sculpture. She is based in New York City and Mabou, Nova Scotia.

Biography 
June Leaf was born in 1929 in Chicago, Illinois. She studied for three months between 1947 and 1948 at the Institute of Design (formerly known as the New Bauhaus), taking classes with artist Hugo Weber. She left school and traveled to Paris in 1948, focusing on creating and identifying abstraction and patterns in her work.

In 1954, she returned to the school for her B.A. degree in Art Education from Roosevelt University and the same year her M.A. degree in Art Education at Institute of Design.

Leaf returned to Paris in 1958–1959 with a Fulbright Grant for painting. When she returned, she moved to New York City in 1960.

She married filmmaker and photographer, Robert Frank in 1971.

In 2016, the Whitney Museum of American Art held the retrospective exhibition "June Leaf: Thought Is Infinite." In the same year, another retrospective was held at the Edward Thorp Gallery in New York, entitled "June Leaf: A Survey, 1949-Present".

Her work is included in many permanent art collections including, the Smithsonian American Art Museum, the Art Institute of Chicago, Museum of Contemporary Art Chicago, Museum of Modern Art (MoMA), Minneapolis Institute of Art.

Works

Coney Island (1968)
Created with pen and ink and colored pencil on paper, 4 × 16 7/8 in. (35.6 × 42.9 cm). June Leaf's 1968 drawing Coney Island is one of her most straightforward images, devoid of the surreal, visionary creatures and places that occupy her creative mind and guide her work. Yet its depiction of a middle-aged couple gazing at an amusement park carousel succinctly encapsulates what her art does: if we envision these protagonists stepping onto the ride, they become an apt metaphor for Leaf's viewers, who similarly must venture into a deeply imagined realm, grounded in real human experience, in which the artist deploys the fantastic to explore the folly of our existence and the possibilities of consciousness.

The Girl with the Hoop (1980)
Created with acrylic and fiber-tipped pen on paper, 8 1/2 × 11 in. (21.6 × 27.9 cm). A relatively simple graphite and ink drawing from 2013 of the artist “threading” her eyes with her fingers finds Leaf literally drawing a line out of her brain/vision. The sheet revisits a motif developed in Threading the Story through the Eye of a Needle from 1974, in which a hand encapsulates an imagined scene seemingly pulled forth—threaded through—the eye of its creator. The hand joins the head explicitly in these images. Leaf's representations and interpretations of thought as “infinite” seem to be her meditations on imagination's expression in the physical world through the artist's corporeality: ruminations on the creative process. The subject of how the mind's contents become manifest through the artist's hand is addressed further in a series of works representing substances that issue forth from the brain in various ways.

Making # 2 (2014–2015)
Artist made sewing treadle, wire, copper, thread, 11 1/2 x 22 x 19 1/2". Making #2 includes the sewing machine base. It is entirely fabricated and features a dancing figure, delicately rendered as a wire line drawing within a circular arc that vibrates when the treadle is worked or the wheel connected to it is turned. Leaf has made many ingenious devices with triggers or other parts that activate little figures. These beg to be manipulated, evoking the delight of those 19th-century hands-on mechanical animations that seem so magical.

Awards 
Leaf was awarded an Honorary Doctorate, Humane Letters in 1984 from DePaul University and in 1996 from Nova Scotia College of Art and Design (NSCAD). She has received many awards including the Distinguished Artists Awards from the Canadian Council in 1984 and a National Endowment for the Arts (NEA) grant in painting in 1989.

Bibliography 
 Enright, Robert, June Leaf. Benteli, 2006. 
 Leaf, June, Record 1974/1975. Göttingen: Steidl, 2010. .
 Leaf, June, Thought Is Infinite. Göttingen: Steidl, 2016.

References

External links 
 Oral history interview with June Leaf (2009 Nov. 16 – 2010 May 17), from Archives of American Art, Smithsonian Institution

National Endowment for the Arts Fellows
1929 births
Illinois Institute of Technology alumni
Living people
Artists from Chicago
Roosevelt University alumni
American women painters
American contemporary painters
21st-century American women artists
Date of birth missing (living people)
21st-century American painters
20th-century American women artists
20th-century American painters